Konstantinos Malioufas (born 1 September 1963) is a retired Greek football defender.

References

1958 births
Living people
Greek footballers
PAOK FC players
Trikala F.C. players
Naoussa F.C. players
Super League Greece players
Association football defenders
Naoussa F.C. managers
Greek football managers
Footballers from Ioannina